Trosna is a rural locality (a selo) and the administrative center of Trosnyansky District, Oryol Oblast, Russia. Population:

References

Notes

Sources

Rural localities in Oryol Oblast
Kromskoy Uyezd